Defending champion Patrick Rafter defeated Mark Philippoussis in the final, 6–3, 3–6, 6–2, 6–0 to win the men's singles tennis title at the 1998 US Open.

Seeds

Qualifying

Draw

Finals

Top half

Section 1

Section 2

Section 3

Section 4

Bottom half

Section 5

Section 6

Section 7

Section 8

External links
 Association of Tennis Professionals (ATP) – 1998 US Open Men's Singles draw
1998 US Open – Men's draws and results at the International Tennis Federation

Men's singlesMen's singles
US Open (tennis) by year – Men's singles